Black Market Rustlers is a 1943 American Western film directed by S. Roy Luby and written by Patricia Harper. The film is the twenty-third in Monogram Pictures' "Range Busters" series, and it stars Ray "Crash" Corrigan as Dusty, Dennis Moore as Denny and Max Terhune as Alibi, with Evelyn Finley, Steve Clark and Glenn Strange. The film was released on August 27, 1943.

Plot

Cast
Ray "Crash" Corrigan as 'Crash' Corrigan 
Dennis Moore as Denny Moore
Max Terhune as 'Alibi' Terhune
Evelyn Finley as Linda Prescott
Steve Clark as Prescott
Glenn Strange as Corbin 
Carl Sepulveda as Sheriff Hanley
George Chesebro as Slade
Hank Worden as Slim
Frank Ellis as Kyper
John Merton as Parry
Frosty Royce as Ed
James Austin as Guitar Player 
Jean Austin as Yodeler 
Ingrid Austin as Accordion Player
Art Fowler as Cowhand / Ukulele Player

See also
The Range Busters series:
 The Range Busters (1940)
 Trailing Double Trouble (1940)
 West of Pinto Basin (1940)
 Trail of the Silver Spurs (1941)
 The Kid's Last Ride (1941)
 Tumbledown Ranch in Arizona (1941)
 Wrangler's Roost (1941)
 Fugitive Valley (1941)
 Saddle Mountain Roundup (1941)
 Tonto Basin Outlaws (1941)
 Underground Rustlers (1941)
 Thunder River Feud (1942)
 Rock River Renegades (1942)
 Boot Hill Bandits (1942)
 Texas Trouble Shooters (1942)
 Arizona Stage Coach (1942)
 Texas to Bataan (1942)
 Trail Riders (1942)
 Two Fisted Justice (1943)
 Haunted Ranch (1943)
 Land of Hunted Men (1943)
 Cowboy Commandos (1943)
 Black Market Rustlers (1943)
 Bullets and Saddles (1943)

References

External links
 

1943 films
1940s English-language films
American Western (genre) films
1943 Western (genre) films
Monogram Pictures films
Films directed by S. Roy Luby
Range Busters
1940s American films